Donald MacLennan (March 22, 1875 – October 19, 1953) was a lawyer and political figure in Nova Scotia, Canada. He represented Inverness County in the Nova Scotia House of Assembly from 1911 to 1925 and then Inverness—Richmond in the House of Commons of Canada from 1935 to 1940 as a Liberal member. MacLennan sat for Margaree Forks division in the Senate of Canada from 1940 to 1953.

He was born in Margaree, Nova Scotia, the son of Donald MacLennan and Flora MacDonald. MacLennan was educated at Saint Francis Xavier College. He received a Bachelor of Laws degree from Dalhousie University in 1905. In the same year, he married Mathilda McDaniel. He was called to the bar in the following year and set up practice at Port Hood. MacLennan was president of the Eastern Journal Publishing Company. He served on the municipal council for Port Hood in 1907 and was named treasurer for Inverness County in 1910. MacLennan ran unsuccessfully for a seat in the House of Commons in 1926, however he was elected in 1935. He remained in office for 18 years until his death at the age of 76.

References 
 
 Allison, D & Tuck, CE History of Nova Scotia, Vol. 3 (1916) p. 267-8

1875 births
1953 deaths
Nova Scotia Liberal Party MLAs
Liberal Party of Canada MPs
Members of the House of Commons of Canada from Nova Scotia
Canadian senators from Nova Scotia